Jalan Mak Lagam (Terengganu state route 124) is a major road in Terengganu, Malaysia.

List of junctions

Roads in Terengganu